Luba (born Lubomyra Kowalchyk, April 24, 1958) is a Canadian musician, singer, songwriter and recording artist from Quebec. She was professionally active from 1980 to 1990, 2000 to 2001 and is active again from 2007 to present.

Career
Luba performed with the band Zorya, which released a self-titled album in 1973. In the 1980s she 
was the vocalist for a band named Luba, and in 1980 that band released the album  Chain Reaction.

Luba later signed as a solo artist under that name. She released three more albums and two EPs. Two of her albums are certified platinum by the Canadian music industry (sales in excess of 100,000 units). She has nine top-40 hits on the Canadian pop charts. Her signature song is "Every time I See Your Picture" (1983). Her most successful song is a cover of Percy Sledge's "When a Man Loves a Woman" which reached No. 6 on the Canadian pop chart and No. 3 on the Canadian adult contemporary chart (1987).

Luba is a three-time winner of the Canadian music industry Juno Award for Female Vocalist of the Year (1985–1987). Her success is limited to her native Canada as she has never charted in the US or elsewhere. In addition to her Juno Awards, Luba has also received CASBY and Félix Awards, and a Black Music Association Award for "Female Entertainer of the Year".  Most recently, her music has been featured on Canadian Idol.  She continues to record music under her own independent label.

Biography

Early life
Luba Kowalchyk was born in Montreal, Quebec, Canada in 1958 to Ukrainian immigrant parents. Growing up she studied piano, guitar, flute and voice. During her teens she traveled across Canada to perform traditional Ukrainian folk songs at weddings and festivals.

Early career
In the 70s, then known as Lubomyra Kowalchyk, Luba released her debut LP with a musical ensemble "Via Zorya". The LP (Виа Зоря – "...Любомира") was released by the label Yeshvan and featured traditional Ukrainian folk songs in new arrangements. It  Two years later, Luba released her first full-length solo LP, called "Lubomyra" via SAGE Promotions. It featured again Ukrainian folk songs, but this time mixed with elements of jazz, blues and rock. Both Ukrainian LPs featured her future drummer Peter Marunzak. With significantly higher production values than the typical standard Ukrainian music albums of the time, Luba's landmark Ukrainian recordings raised the bar for this music genre in the diaspora, setting the gold standard that was subsequently met by Kvitka Cisyk and Darka & Slavko. Luba released a single in French in 1979 called "Le Doux Rendez-vous" with the Label Bobinason. A year before the release of "Le Doux Rendez-vous, she formed a band under her first name Luba. Their debut album Chain Reaction was released on an independent label in 1980 and received only minimal interest outside of their native Montreal.

Breakthrough in Canada
Luba enjoyed her greatest success in Canada between 1983 and 1987. Capitol-EMI of Canada signed Luba Kowalchyk as a solo artist under the one name moniker Luba in 1982. A self-titled EP followed in late 1982 and the top 40 hit "Every time I See Your Picture" in early 1983. In 1984 Luba released her first full-length album called Secrets and Sins. It issued the singles "Let It Go" and "Storm Before The Calm" both reaching the Canadian top-40 charts. Luba earned her first Canadian music industry Juno Award for Female Vocalist of the Year in 1985. Later the same year, she recorded several songs written by Stephen Lunt, Jon Stroll and Kevin Gillis for the first season of the Canadian cartoon series The Raccoons. Several of these songs were later re-recorded by Lisa Lougheed for use in later seasons. Two of Luba's songs are featured on the 1986 movie soundtrack 9 Weeks starring Kim Basinger and Mickey Rourke: "Let It Go" from her Secrets and Sins album and one not previously released by Luba, "The Best is Yet to Come." In 1986, Luba released Between the Earth & Sky, which included the single "How Many (Rivers To Cross)".  This top 20 Canadian hit had represented Canada at the 1985 World Popular Song Festival in Tokyo, Japan and made the finals. Also in 1986, Luba won her second straight Juno as Canada's best female vocalist. Shortly after the album release, Luba's band was involved in a serious bus accident, although Luba herself was not on board the bus at the time.  Luba and her band took some time off, returning in 1987 with Over 60 Minutes With Luba, a compilation of her hits with one new track, a live recording of "When A Man Loves A Woman".  This track would become her biggest Canadian hit, peaking at No. 6 on the RPM top 100.  She would cap the year with her third straight "Best Female Vocalist" Juno.

All or Nothing; breaking into the US
By 1988 Luba's music was being played mainly in Canada, Her label brought in new management to promote her work in the United States. Her next album, All Or Nothing, was recorded over a year and half across 7 studios using various session musicians. Released in the fall of 1989, the album included the singles "Giving Away A Miracle," "No More Words", and "Little Salvation". The band recorded an acoustic, live-in-the-studio show in Toronto and released as Live on Tour in 1990.  All Or Nothing appeared on the RPM Top 100 chart that year and reached platinum status in Canada.  With few sales in the US, her label then dropped her before the end of the year.

Withdrawal from music
During the 1990s, Luba experienced both professional and personal problems that resulted in her withdrawing from the music industry. In 1990, her marriage to band drummer and manager Peter Marunzak ended in divorce. Following her release from Capitol Records, she struggled to land a contract with another major record label. Her grandmother and then her mother both died while her sister, and lone relative left in Canada, developed multiple sclerosis that required intensive care. Finally, Luba felt she was missing out on a "regular" life from years of long hours in the music industry. Altogether, Luba decided to put her career on hold and focus on other priorities. Luba's most notable performance during the 1990s was as the featured halftime performer at the 1991 Grey Cup game in Winnipeg, Manitoba.

Return to music
The latest album by Luba, From the Bitter to the Sweet, was released in 2000 on her own label Azure Music. While the album won some critical acclaim, and produced the Top 30 single "Is She A Lot Like Me?", it did not match the sales or radio airplay as her earlier albums. At year's end she was featured in a concert performance on a Canadian program entitled An Evening with the Stars which included both new and old material.

Two new songs by Luba appeared on a member music page of the popular social networking site MySpace. One was a ballad called "Heaven," and the other more upbeat was called "Time."  These were potential singles for an album release mentioned on both Luba's MySpace page and her official website. An 18 April 2007 update on Luba's official website states that Luba chose to use MySpace to connect with her fans as well as for posting her music. Additional information is included on there as well as a link to her MySpace page. Both new singles are available for adding to other MySpace members' music profiles.

Luba moved from Canada in mid-2007 and currently lives in Anguilla. She is still very focused on her passion, writing and singing, and is working on a new album which will highlight her roots in soul/R&B music. As well, she is pursuing another passion in photography where her work has already garnered tremendous critical acclaim due to her distinct compositional style and innovative approach. She is also closely involved with animal causes, working with various animal shelters in providing service dogs to people suffering from physical and psychological trauma.

On 18 February 2014, a new compilation album called ICON was released by Universal Music Canada. The album contains remastered versions of hits from her albums Secrets and Sins, Between the Earth & Sky, All or Nothing and From the Bitter to the Sweet, as well as a new track, "Heaven", which was previously previewed on Luba's MySpace page in 2007. In August she performed her first live concert in 14 years, at the Fierté Montréal festival.

Awards
Luba remains one of the more successful female artists in Canadian music history despite never charting in the US. Her three consecutive Juno awards for Female Vocalist of the Year puts her in select company: only Anne Murray (9) and Celine Dion (6) have more.

Discography
As a singer, Luba has released seven full-length studio albums (two of which in Ukrainian, one studio EP, one live EP, two compilation albums and multiple singles. Music of hers has been featured on the cartoon series The Raccoons as well as on movies, most notably 9½ Weeks (1986) and Keeping Track (1987).

Albums

Studio albums
Вокально-Iнструментальний Ансамбль Зоря – ... Любомира (1973) – with the musical ensemble Via Zorya (Віа Зоря)
Lubomyra (Ukr: Любомира) (1975) 
Chain Reaction (1980) – with band, named "Luba"
Secrets and Sins (1984)
Between the Earth & Sky (1986)
All or Nothing (1989)
From the Bitter to the Sweet (2000)

EPs
Luba (1982)
On Tour (1990)

Compilation albums
Over 60 Minutes With Luba (1987)
ICON (2014)

Singles

Other songs
 "Ain't No Planes" (1985) – from the cartoon series "The Raccoons"
 "Hang On, Hold On" (1985) – from the cartoon series "The Raccoons" 
 "All Life Long" (1985) – duet with Curtis King Jr., from the cartoon series "The Raccoons"
 "Here I Go Again" (1985) – duet with Curtis King Jr., from the cartoon series "The Raccoons"
 "Keeping Track" (1987) – duet with Dorian Sherwood, appears on the 1987 movie with the same name.
 "Time" (2007) – appears on Luba's MySpace page
 "Another Lonely Day" (2007) – appears on Luba's MySpace page

References

External links
 Official website
 CanadianBands.com entry
 Luba at canoe.ca
 Luba on MySpace

1958 births
Living people
Canadian emigrants to Anguilla
Juno Award for Artist of the Year winners
Canadian people of Ukrainian descent
Canadian women rock singers
Canadian women pop singers
Singers from Montreal
20th-century Canadian women singers
21st-century Canadian women singers